Mashhad Torqi-ye Olya (also Romanized as Mashhad Ţorqī-ye ‘Olyā; also known as Mashhad Ţorqī-ye Bālā) is a village in Golian Rural District, in the Central District of Shirvan County, North Khorasan Province, Iran. At the 2006 census, its population was 314, in 84 families.

References 

Populated places in Shirvan County